125th Brigade may refer to:

 125th Mixed Brigade (Spain)
 125th (Lancashire Fusiliers) Brigade (United Kingdom)
 125th Brigade Support Battalion (United States)
 125th Territorial Defense Brigade (Ukraine)

See also

 125th Division (disambiguation)